Rushall may refer to:

Places
Rushall, Herefordshire, England
Rushall, Norfolk, England
Rushall, West Midlands, England
Rushall railway station, West Midlands, England
Rushall, Wiltshire, England
Rushall railway station, Melbourne, Australia

People
Helen Rushall (1914–1984), Scottish treasurer
Richard Rushall (1864–1953), English businessman